Tilloidea notata, is a species of checkered beetle found in India, Sri Lanka, Sumatra, Philippines, China, Japan.

Biology
Adult female lays about 90 to 400 eggs in egg masses. Life span of the adult ranges from 21 to 62 days.

It is a predator of Phloeosinus aubei, Dinoderus minutus, Dinoderus ocellaris, Lasioderma serricorne, Rhyzopertha dominica, Sitophilus zeamais, and Stegobium paniceum.

References 

Cleridae
Insects of Sri Lanka
Beetles described in 1842